Buffalo China, Inc., formerly known as Buffalo Pottery, was a company founded in 1901 in Buffalo, New York as a manufacturer of semi-vitreous, and later vitreous, china. Prior to its acquisition by Oneida Ltd. in 1983, the company was one of the largest manufacturers of commercial chinaware in the United States.

Early history
Buffalo Pottery was founded in 1901 by John D. Larkin (1845-1926) to supply the Larkin Company with premiums for its customers. The company's first general manager, Lewis H. Bown, recruited a number of skilled craftsmen and artisans from throughout the United States, including William J. Rea, Anna Kappler, and Ralph Stuart.

Buffalo Pottery was located on 8.5 acres at Seneca Street and Hayes Place in Buffalo, New York.  At the time of its completion in 1903, the 80,000 square foot plant was the largest fireproof pottery in the world; and it was also the only pottery in the world completely operated by electricity.

 In addition to the china produced for distribution as premiums to Larkin customers, Buffalo Pottery produced many lines of semi-vitreous china, including Deldare Ware, Roosevelt Bears, and Abino Ware, as well as the first Blue Willow dinnerware manufactured in the United States. These wares were distributed via wholesale and retail channels. By 1911, the company had 250 employees and was selling its products in 27 countries.

In 1915, the company began manufacturing vitrified china and a few years later the plant was enlarged to 300,000 square feet. During World War I, it primarily manufactured china for the US armed forces.

Under the leadership of John D. Larkin, Jr. (1877–1945) in the late 1920s, Buffalo Pottery changed its focus to manufacturing custom institutional, restaurant, railroad, steamship, and hotel ware. The company would produce ware for such entities as the Chesapeake & Ohio Railway (George Washington and Chessie Cat services), the Greenbrier, the Ahwahnee Hotel at Yosemite, the Roycroft Inn, the 1939 New York World's Fair, and the US Navy. In 1931, Buffalo Pottery began production using its patented Lamelle process which reinforced the china to reduce breakage. From 1934–1937, Buffalo Pottery's art director was the noted modernist artist Ilonka Karasz.

Intermediate years
During World War II, the company again manufactured primarily for the US military.  However, the company was declared a non-essential factory and was not permitted to replace employees who left to serve in the military.  Having lost some of its best skilled labor and with competitors not subject to similar regulation, the company turned to automation, with new equipment funded by the sale of several buildings.  In 1946, Robert E. Gould (1900–1979), known in the ceramics industry as the "master potter," was named president.  By this time, economic efficiency had forced the company to drop customization in favor of mass production of a limited catalog of designs.

In 1956, the company changed its name from Buffalo Pottery to Buffalo China, Inc.

Harold M. Esty, Jr. (1914–1986), John D. Larkin's grandson, served as the company's president from 1964 until 1970, overseeing the production of a wider range of designs and the installation of state-of-the-art direct screening, offset printing, and glaze equipment.  By 1965, the company was producing a quarter of a million pieces of vitrified china per week in more than 50 patterns. Esty remained on the board of directors until the company's sale in 1983.

Later years
In 1970, John C. Heebner (1922–2013) became Buffalo China's fifth and last president.  He oversaw a modernization project, completed in 1979, which increased the plant's capacity by 50 percent.

In 1983, Oneida Limited purchased Buffalo China with Heebner serving on Oneida's board until 1994. Oneida increased Buffalo China's manufacturing space and added a manufacturing plant in Mexico.  In 2004, due to an economic downturn, Oneida sold the factory in Buffalo to Niagara Ceramics Corporation and closed the factory in Mexico, thus ending Buffalo China's 100-year history of china manufacturing. As of 2019, Oneida still retains the Buffalo China trade name and logos, and sells a few lines of Buffalo brand dinnerware.

Collectibles
Buffalo Pottery and pre-1983 Buffalo China chinaware is considered highly collectible by antique, porcelain, hotel/restaurant ware, and railroad collectors.  Rarer hand-decorated pieces of lines such as Deldare Ware and Abino Ware have sold for thousands of dollars each.

Gallery

See also
 Larkin Company
 John D. Larkin
 Restaurant Ware
 Oneida Limited

References

External links
 Larkin Company/Buffalo Pottery: A bibliography by The Buffalo History Museum
 Kovels Buffalo Pottery Price Guide
 Replacements.com List of Buffalo Pottery Patterns

Manufacturing companies established in 1901
Ceramics manufacturers of the United States
Manufacturing companies based in Buffalo, New York
1901 establishments in New York (state)
1983 mergers and acquisitions
American companies established in 1901
Manufacturing companies disestablished in 2004
2004 disestablishments in New York (state)